Margarita Tarradell Asencio (born November 30, 1962 in Santiago de Cuba) is a Cuban sport shooter. She has competed for Cuba in pistol shooting at three Olympics (1992, 2000, and 2004), and has produced an illustrious career tally of fifteen medals in a major international competition, a total of four (one gold, two silver, and one bronze) at the Pan American Games (1991 to 2003), a total of five (two gold and three silver) at the American Championships, and a total of six (four golds, one silver, and one bronze) at numerous meets of the ISSF World Cup series.

Career
Tarradell competed internationally for Cuba at the 1991 Pan American Games in Havana, where she became the champion in sport pistol shooting. The following year, she made her first Cuban team at the 1992 Summer Olympics in Barcelona, finishing thirty-first in the air pistol and twenty-fourth in the sport pistol with scores of 374 and 572 respectively.

Despite missing out her 1996 Olympic bid, Tarradell came back from an eight-year absence to compete for her second Games in Sydney 2000, following a bronze-medal triumph in air pistol shooting at the Pan American Games a year earlier. From there, she finished in a five-way tie with a number of prominent shooters, including eventual Olympic bronze medalist Lalita Yauhleuskaya, for eleventh place in the air pistol, shooting a substantial 381 out of a possible 400. Tarradell also competed in the sport pistol, where she fired a total of 575 points (283 in precision and 292 in the rapid fire) to obtain a twentieth position.

In 2003, Tarradell reached the peak of her career by securing the silver medal in sport pistol shooting at the Pan American Games in Santo Domingo, Dominican Republic. Briefly commanding her lead throughout the final, Tarradell held a tiebreaker with U.S. shooter Sandra Uptagrafft for the gold, until she lost in a shoot-off by just three-tenths of a point. In spite of her tough defeat, she was also awarded an Olympic quota place for Cuba on her third Games.

At the 2004 Summer Olympics in Athens, Tarradell qualified for her third Cuban squad, as a 41-year-old, in both air and sport pistol. She managed to get a minimum qualifying score of 568 on her latter event to gain an Olympic quota place for Cuba in shooting, following a runner-up finish at the Pan American Games. in the  10 m air pistol, held on the third day of the Games, Tarradell fired a substandard 368 out of a possible 400 to share a thirty-fifth place tie with Colombia's Amanda Mondol and Costa Rica's Grettel Barboza in the qualifying round. Two days later, in the 25 m pistol, Tarradell shot 282 in precision and 283 in the rapid-fire stage to tally 565 in a two-way tie with Belarus' Viktoria Chaika for thirty-second position, just three points below her entry standard.

Olympic results

References

External links

1962 births
Living people
Cuban female sport shooters
Olympic shooters of Cuba
Shooters at the 1992 Summer Olympics
Shooters at the 2000 Summer Olympics
Shooters at the 2004 Summer Olympics
Shooters at the 2003 Pan American Games
Pan American Games gold medalists for Cuba
Pan American Games silver medalists for Cuba
Pan American Games bronze medalists for Cuba
Sportspeople from Santiago de Cuba
Shooters at the 1999 Pan American Games
Pan American Games medalists in shooting
Medalists at the 1999 Pan American Games
20th-century Cuban women
21st-century Cuban women